Zan-e Rooz ("Woman of Today") is a women's weekly Persian-language magazine published in Tehran, Iran. The magazine was first published in 1964. The first issue hit the newsstands in Tehran on 27 February 1965, and the magazine gained an immediate success. The inaugural issue of Zan-e Ruz was published in 15,000 copies, and in 1968 the magazine boasted a print run of 140,000 copies. Its founding editor-in-chief and co-founder was Majid Davami. Before Islamic revolution Kayhan publishing company was the editorial and publisher. After the Iranian Revolution, as women's political activity alongside men increased, publications focusing on women's issues sprang up to answer the increased demand. Due to this, Zan-e Rooz shifted from being a Western-style gossip sheet to a publication dedicated to exploring the rights of women within the Islamic framework.

Contributors
Writers with this publication include Poopak Niktalab, Nooshafarin Ansari and Aminollah Rezaei.

References

External links

1964 establishments in Iran
Feminism in Iran
Feminist magazines
Magazines established in 1964
Magazines published in Tehran
Persian-language magazines
Weekly magazines published in Iran
Women's magazines published in Iran